Mid Canterbury (also spelt Mid-Canterbury and mid-Canterbury) is a traditional, semi-official subregion of New Zealand's Canterbury Region extending inland from the Pacific coast to the Southern Alps. It is one of four traditional sub-regions of Canterbury, along with South Canterbury, North Canterbury, and Christchurch City. 

The area is mainly agricultural, extending as it does across the Canterbury Plains, rising in the west to the high country. Beyond this the land rises sharply to the main divide and peaks of the Southern Alps. Several prominent peaks lie in Mid Canterbury, most notably the country's 23rd-highest mountain, the  Mount Dixon. 

Various points are designated as being the southern and northern limits of Mid Canterbury, but all definitions of it include that area between the mouths of the Rangitata River and Rakaia Rivers, roughly coterminous with the Ashburton District. Some definitions push the northern border north to include Lake Coleridge and the approaches to Arthur's Pass, and increase the southern extent to include the Peel Forest and Orari Gorge.

Smaller towns  include Methven, Rakaia, Mt Somers, Mayfield and Hinds. Other features of the region include Mount Hutt and its associated skifield, the Ashburton River / Hakatere and Ashburton Lakes, the Rakaia Gorge, Pudding Hill, and Rangitata Island.

Many corporations, companies, and government agencies within the area use "Mid Canterbury" as part of their names, notably the Mid Canterbury Rugby Football Union. A former political electorate of Mid-Canterbury existed between 1928 and 1946.

References

External links
Experience Mid Canterbury
Mid Canterbury, Christchurchnz.com
Carlson, L. "Mid-Canterbury: The South Island's best-kept secret," AA New Zealand. 12 April 2017. Retrieved 11 March 2018.

Canterbury, New Zealand